Shake These Walls is the third studio album from Canadian country music artist Tim Hicks. It was released on September 9, 2016, via Open Road Recordings and Universal Music Canada.

Track listing

Charts

Album

Singles

References 

2016 albums
Tim Hicks albums
Albums produced by Todd Clark